Mainframe Studios is a Canadian computer animation company owned by Wow Unlimited Media and based in Vancouver, British Columbia. Founded in 1993 as Mainframe Entertainment Inc. by Christopher Brough, Ian Pearson, Phil Mitchell, Gavin Blair and John Grace, the company established itself as a leading contributor to the introduction of computer-generated imagery (CGI) in animation, film and television.

The company previously operated as a subsidiary of Starz Inc. (at the time a division of IDT Corporation) between 2003 and 2007. Local post production firm, Rainmaker Income Fund, acquired a majority stake in the company, initially rebranding it in the process as Rainmaker Animation and would fold into it in 2008, permanently rebranding it as Rainmaker Entertainment. Rainmaker would revive the "Mainframe Entertainment" name for its then-newly-created division meant for television production. On 25 October 2016, the company announced a triple acquisition and merger of Frederator Networks and Erzin-Hirsh Entertainment to create the holding company, WOW! Unlimited Media, and rebrand a second time to Rainmaker Studios. In 2020, the company would rebrand a third and final time to Mainframe Studios to return to their "Mainframe Entertainment" name roots.

The company is best known for the production of the first fully computer-animated television series, ReBoot, Beast Wars, a reimagined relaunch of Transformers from Hasbro and since 2001, in partnership with American toy company, Mattel, the majority of films which later expanded into other audiovisual media to create a multimedia franchise for its flagship fashion doll property, Barbie.

History

As Mainframe Entertainment
The company was established in 1993 as Mainframe Entertainment Inc. by Christopher Brough, a noted Los Angeles-based animation producer and a British animation team known as "The Hub" – Gavin Blair, Ian Pearson, Phil Mitchell and John Grace. They were looking to create ReBoot, the first fully computer-animated television series, after having used the technology to produce music videos like Money for Nothing and Let's Get Rocked. Due to the cost of shipping equipment back home, advantageous tax credits and proximity to Los Angeles, the company set up shop in Vancouver, Canada.

In 1994, ReBoot launched on ABC in the United States and YTV in Canada. The series intermittently ran for four seasons with production ending in 2001. The company's second project was produced for American toy company Hasbro. Beast Wars (known in Canada as Beasties), a relaunch of the Transformers brand, debuted in 1996 and concluded in 1999. A follow-up, Beast Machines was produced between 1999 and 2000. Both ReBoot and Beast Wars were produced with Alliance Communications, who had taken a 50% ownership of Mainframe. In 1996, Mainframe paid $17 million to reduce Alliance's share to 15%.

Mainframe became a publicly traded company with a listing on the Toronto Stock Exchange on June 17, 1997. In conjunction with the public offering, Alliance sold 700,000 shares in the company, lowering their ownership to 7.8%. Christopher Brough became the CEO, Pearson the president, Blair as director of operations and Mitchell as Blair's assistant/vice. In its first year on the stock exchange, Mainframe posted an $11 million loss despite producing hit multi-award-winning computer-animated shows during this period.

Mainframe opened its American division in Los Angeles on 17 April 1998 to be led by Dan DiDio and oversee content development, production and local distribution. DiDio previously worked with Mainframe through his stint as executive director of children's programming at ABC.

After having earlier produced two ReBoot themed rides for the company, the IMAX Corporation made a $16 million investment in the company in 1999, which gave IMAX roughly 30% ownership of Mainframe, included the creation of a new joint venture meant to facilitate the creation of animated films based on Gulliver's Travels and Pied Piper, with a third project titled Pandora’s Box. The films were intended to be stereoscopic, 3D feature length releases, though none of the three saw completion.

At the end of the 1999 fiscal year, the company reported a $17 million loss. Thanks to episode deliveries for Beast Machines, Beast Wars, Shadow Raiders and Weird-Oh's the company posted its first profit of $1.4 million in fiscal 2000. Buoyed by Heavy Gear, Action Man and their first direct-to-video film, Casper's Haunted Christmas, Mainframe posted another profit of $2.4 million for fiscal 2001. Despite the success, the company faced a major management shakeup that year. Pearson had stepped down as president in June and left the company shortly after, with fellow co-founders Blair and Mitchell also leaving in 2002 and 2005, respectively.

In 2001, American toy maker Mattel partnered with Mainframe to produce Barbie in the Nutcracker. The direct-to-video feature sold more than  million units in its first year. The success of the release led to a longstanding relationship between Mattel and the animation studio. Mainframe (and its successors) would later produce the majority of the franchise's direct-to-video films, as well as a television series.

Following financial losses of $18.9 million and $7.5 million in fiscal 2002 and 2003, the American IDT Corporation announced it would purchase 56% of Mainframe for $14 million on September 16, 2003. After the cancellation of Spider-Man: The New Animated Series that same year, the company moved away from producing television series. While a number of projects were announced they ultimately did not see fruition, including a pre-school oriented ReBoot spinoff called Binomes as well as Mainframe's first live-action production, an adaptation of Harriet the Spy. In 2005, the company acquired the distribution rights to the live-action/CGI-animated television series Zixx. Mainframe also provided animation for the show's second and third seasons in conjunction with Thunderbird Films. The bulk of the company's work now consisted of direct-to-video projects and television specials.

After producing the visuals for the 2003 MTV Movie Awards, Mainframe started a creative services division to produce video game animation, graphic design, motion graphics, titling, show opening sequences and branding in 2005. This branch of the company worked on a number of projects, including cut-scenes for Prototype, 50 Cent: Blood on the Sand and Ghostbusters: The Video Game, as well as the 2006 MTV Movie Awards.

As Rainmaker

Finding itself under new ownership, IDT sold its 62% stake in Mainframe to Vancouver-based post-production firm Rainmaker Income Fund on 20 July 2006 for $13.8 million. The next month Rainmaker announced it would acquire the remaining 38% of Mainframe. On January 30, 2007 Mainframe was renamed to Rainmaker Animation. Later that year, Rainmaker sold its visual effects and post production divisions to Deluxe Entertainment Services Group, leaving only the animation business.

In June 2012, Chinese animation studio Xing Xing Digital announced its intent to purchase Rainmaker, with the company willing to pay off Rainmaker's $7 million debt. The purchase was called off after Rainmaker and Xing Xing were unable to finalize the sale by September 14, 2012.

In 2013, Rainmaker completed its first theatrical feature film, Escape from Planet Earth. Directed by Cal Brunker, it received mixed reviews from critics but was a success at the box office, grossing around $75 million worldwide. On 7 October that same year, Rainmaker launched a television production division and revived the "Mainframe Entertainment" brand for its title, starting with a CG-animated incarnation of Bob the Builder.

Rainmaker released its second theatrical feature film, Ratchet & Clank based on the video game series of the same name by Insomniac Games, in the first quarter of 2016 to financial failure. This poor reception to the film caused Rainmaker to take a $10 million impairment charge on their investment in the production and was later cited as the reason the company abandoned plans to adapt the Sly Cooper video game franchise into a theatrical film.

Later that year on 25 October, Rainmaker announced their intent to acquire and merge Erzin-Hirsh Entertainment and American-based Frederator Networks (and its main division, Frederator Studios) and consolidate them under its then-new holding company, WOW! Unlimited Media Inc. (TSX:WOW.A). At that time, the company changed the names of its home-base divisions to Rainmaker Studios and Mainframe Studios. Since the reorganization, the company has been heavily involved in television production animating ReBoot: The Guardian Code, a live-action/CGI-animated re-imagining of the ReBoot brand, Barbie: Dreamhouse Adventures, the first-ever full-length TV series in the "Barbie" media franchise and Spy Kids: Mission Critical, the animated reboot/spin-off of the Spy Kids (franchise) in 2018. In 2019, the studio released its first traditionally-animated production, a pilot based on Knowledge Network mascots made in Toon Boom Harmony.

As Mainframe Studios
On 16 March 2020, the studio announced it would be rebranding as Mainframe Studios and consolidate Rainmaker Studios under the "Mainframe" branding and fully returning the studio to their original "Mainframe" name. Due to the COVID-19 pandemic, Mainframe Studios initiated remote work measures for its employees.

On 24 June 2021, the company confirmed that it would develop a 2D-animation pipeline in support of its first production in the medium, an animated series inspired by YouTube personality Guava Juice. The following August, Mainframe announced that it would open a virtual studio in Toronto in the east of the country, building upon its earlier remote work experience.

Productions list

Television series/shows

Films/Movies
Features/Cinematic/Theatrical:

Television:

Direct-to-video (DTV):

Other credits
50 Cent: Blood on the Sand (video game trailer)
Ghostbusters: The Video Game (Pre-rendered cut scenes)
Ghost Hunter Dax
Good Boy! (CG effects)
Harriet the Spy
Legion of 5
Luna, Chip & Inkie in The Festival of Wishes
The Outer Limits (1995-2001) (CG effects)
2003 MTV Movie Awards
2006 MTV Movie Awards
Prototype (video game trailer)
WET (video game trailer)
Ratchet & Clank: Life of Pie (2021)
Ready2Robot (web-series)
Stargate SG-1 (1997-2007) (CG effects)

References

External links

Canadian companies established in 1993
Mass media companies established in 1993
Companies formerly listed on the TSX Venture Exchange
Canadian animation studios
1993 establishments in British Columbia
 
Wow Unlimited Media
Companies based in Vancouver
2016 mergers and acquisitions